Code page 1017 (CCSID 1017), also known as CP1017, is IBM's code page for the Danish version of ISO 646 (ISO-646-DK), specified in DS 2089.

Code page layout

See also
Code page 1105 (similar DEC NRCS code page)
Code page 1107 (similar DEC NRCS code page)

References

1017
Danish language